Melaka Football Club, or simply known as the Melaka F.C., is a Malaysian professional football club based in Malacca City, Malacca. The team plays in the second tier of Malaysian football, the Malaysia M3 League. The club's home ground is the 1,000 capacity Hang Tuah Stadium.

History
Following the dissolution of Melaka United F.C., Melaka F.C. was founded as a continuation of the previous club, though they will not inherit the honours and titles won by Melaka United.

Melaka F.C. filled the slot left by Melaka United when the club got ejected from the 2022 Malaysia Super League.

Players

Management team

Club personnel
 Team Manager:  Muhammad Najmi Nordin
 Asst. Team Manager:  Norizam Ali Hassan
 Head coach:  Pedro Hipólito 
 Assistant coach :  Leong Hong Seng
 Goalkeeping coach:  Hazalani Jaafar 
 Fitness coach:  Rashid Mahmud 
 Physio :  Prem Ghanesh 
 Team Media :  Azizi Shahril
 Kitman : Ahmad Syukri Othman

Season by season record

References

Malaysia M3 League
Football clubs in Malaysia